The 1904 Southwest Texas State Football team was an American football team that represented Southwest Texas State Normal School—now known as Texas State University–as an independent during the 1904 college football season. This was the inaugural season for Southwest Texas State football program. The team had no head coach and finished the season with a record of 5–1.

Schedule

References

Southwest Texas State
Texas State Bobcats football seasons
Southwest Texas State Bobcats football